The Longhua Temple (alternatively Lunghwa Temple; literally "Dragon Flower Temple") is a Buddhist temple dedicated to the Maitreya Buddha in Shanghai. Although most of the present day buildings date from later reconstructions, the temple preserves the architectural design of a Song dynasty (960–1279) monastery of the Chan School. It is the largest, most authentic and complete ancient temple complex in the city of Shanghai.

History

The temple was first built in 242 AD, during the Three Kingdoms Period (220–280). According to a legend, Sun Quan, King of the Kingdom of Wu (222–280), had obtained Sharira relics, which are cremated remains of the Buddha. To house these precious relics, the king ordered the construction of 13 pagodas. Longhua Pagoda, part of the Longhua temple complex, is said to have been one of them. Like the function of the pagoda, the name of the temple also has its origin in a local legend according to which a dragon once appeared on the site.

The temple was destroyed by war towards the end of the Tang dynasty (618–907) and rebuilt in 977 AD, under the autonomous Kingdom of Wuyue during the Northern Song dynasty period (960–1127). (According to another version of the story, as contained in Song (960–1279) and Yuan dynasty (1271–1368) local histories, the temple was first built by the King of Wuyue.) Later in the Song dynasty, in 1064, it was renamed "Kongxiang Temple", but the original name "Longhua Temple" was restored in the Ming dynasty (1368–1644) during the reign of the Wanli Emperor (1573–1620).

The present architectural design follows the Song dynasty (960–1279) original. However, whereas the core of the present Longhua Pagoda survives from that period, most buildings in the temple proper were rebuilt during the reigns of the Tongzhi Emperor (1862–1874) and the Guangxu Emperor (1875–1908) in the Qing dynasty (1644–1911). A modern restoration of the entire temple complex was carried out in 1954.

The temple and monastery were originally surrounded by extensive gardens and orchards. Viewing of the peach blossom in the Longhua gardens was an annual attraction for people in surrounding cities.

The temple grounds have been used as a site for internment as well as for executions. Public executions were held on the site in the 20th century. In 1927, the Kuomintang( 國民黨） carried out a purge of suspected communists in Shanghai. Thousands of victims of this purge were brought to the temple grounds to be executed. They are commemorated today by the Longhua Martyrs Cemetery behind the temple. During the Second Sino-Japanese War, the Japanese operated their largest civilian internment camp in the area, where American, British, as well as nationals of other allied countries were held under poor conditions.

The temple's extensive gardens have since been almost entirely absorbed into the neighboring Longhua Martyrs' Cemetery and have been extensively reconstructed in a contemporary monumental style. A small traditional garden remains immediately adjacent to the temple buildings.

Architectural design and artwork

The layout of the temple is that of a Song dynasty monastery of the Buddhist Chan sect, known as the Sangharama Five-Hall Style. Five main halls are arranged along a central north-south pointing axis. From the entrance or Shanmen, the buildings are:

Maitreya Hall
The Maitreya Hall housing a statue of Maitreya buddha and another in his manifestation as "Budai", or Cloth bag monk.

Four Heavenly Kings Hall
The Four Heavenly Kings Hall housing statues of the Four Heavenly Kings.

Mahavira Hall
The Mahavira Hall is the main hall, housing statues of the historical Buddha (Shakyamuni) and two disciples. At the back of the hall is a bas-relief carving, including a depiction of Guanyin, or the Bodhisattva Avalokiteśvara in his female manifestation. Around the front portion are arranged the twenty Guardians of Buddhist Law, and around the back the sixteen principal arhats. The hall also features an ancient bell cast in 1586, during the Wanli era of the Ming dynasty.

Three Sages Hall
The Three Sages Hall houses statues of the Amitabha buddha, and the Bodhisattvas Avalokiteśvara (male form) and Mahāsthāmaprāpta.

Abbot's Hall
The Abbot's Hall is a place for lectures and formal meetings.

Bell tower and Drum tower
A Bell Tower and a Drum Tower are arranged off the central axis. The bell is used in the Evening Bell-Striking Ceremony conducted on New Year's Eve. Also situated off the main axis is a shrine to Ksitigarbha (Dizang the King Bodhisattva).

Buddhist Texts Library
The Buddhist Texts Library houses various versions of sutras and other Buddhist works, as well as ceremonial instruments, antiques, and artifacts.

Artworks in the temple include statues of the Maitreya Buddha in his Bodhisattva form and in his Cloth Bag Monk incarnation, statues of the Eighteen Arhats and 20 Guardians of Buddhist Law, as well as statues of the 500 arhats.

Longhua Pagoda

The Longhua Pagoda is best well-known of the 16 historic pagodas that still stand within the Shanghai municipality. It has an octagonal floor layout. The size of the seven stories decreases from bottom to top. The pagoda consists of a hollow, tube-like brick core surrounded by a wooden staircase. On the outside, it is decorated with balconies, banisters, and upturned eaves. These outer decorations have been reconstructed in keeping with the original style.

Although previous pagodas existed on the same site, the current brick base and body of the pagoda was built in 977 under the Wuyue kingdome (907–978), with continuous renovations of its more fragile wooden components on the exterior. Because of its age, the pagoda is fragile and is not open to the public.

Temple fair
The Longhua Temple Fair has been held since the Ming dynasty annually on the third day of the third month of the Lunar Calendar, when - according to local legend - the dragons visit the temple to help grant the people's wishes. It coincides with the blossoming of the peach trees in Longhua Park. Since its inception, the fair has been an annual event interrupted only by the Cultural Revolution and the SARS outbreak.

Location
The Longhua Temple is located on the Longhua area (formerly Longhua township) of Shanghai (named after the temple). Its street address is No. 2853 Longhua Road (Longhua Lu). It is open to the public for a fee (10 RMB) which includes incense. To go there by subway you can take line 12 followed by a bit of walking or bike riding .

In popular culture
J. G. Ballard in his World War II-era autobiographical novel Empire of the Sun describes the Japanese military use of the Longhua pagoda as a flak cannon tower.  In Steven Spielberg's film adaptation of the book, the pagoda is clearly visible above the prison camp.

References
D.C. Burn, A Guide to Lunghwa Temple, Shanghai:  Kelly & Walsh (1926).
Eric N. Danielson, Discover Shanghai, Singapore:  Marshal Cavendish 2010). [pp. 73–81 on Longhua, and pp. 98–100 on Shanghai's 16 historic pagodas.] 
Eric N. Danielson, “How Old is Shanghai's Longhua Temple?” Hong Kong:  Journal of the Hong Kong Branch of the Royal Asiatic Society, Vol. 43, 2003 (2006). [pp. 15–28]
Longhua Zhen Zhi, Shanghai (1996).
Pan Mingquan, Shanghai Fo Si, Dao Guan, Shanghai:  Shanghai Ci Shu Chubanshe(2003).
Zhang Qinghua and Zhu Baikui, Longhua, Yangzhou:  Guanglin Shu She (2003).

Bibliography

External links

How Old is Shanghai's Longhua Temple?
Journal of the Royal Asiatic Society Hong Kong Branch
Chinatravel1.com
China Daily
short article in "The Economist" (site history)
Longhua Monastery, Architectura Sinica Site Archive

10th-century Buddhist temples
977
Architectural history
Buddhist temples in Shanghai
Architecture in China
Landmarks in Shanghai
Song dynasty
Xuhui District
Major National Historical and Cultural Sites in Shanghai
Linji school temples